

The Sopwith Grasshopper was a British two-seat touring biplane built by the Sopwith Aviation and Engineering Company at Kingston upon Thames in 1919.

Development
The Grasshopper was a conventional two-seat open-cockpit biplane, with a nose-mounted 100 hp (75 kW) Anzani engine. Only one aircraft was built, registered G-EAIN, which obtained its Certificate of Airworthiness in March 1920. It passed through a number of private operators until 1929 when the Certificate was not renewed. The last owner had been Constance Leathart.

Specifications

References

Notes

Bibliography

1920s British civil utility aircraft
Grasshopper
Single-engined tractor aircraft
Aircraft first flown in 1920
Biplanes